Lake Ladoga (or ,  [earlier in Finnish Nevajärvi];) is a freshwater lake located in the Republic of Karelia and Leningrad Oblast in northwestern Russia, in the vicinity of Saint Petersburg. 

It is the largest lake located entirely in Europe, the second largest lake after Baikal in Russia, and the 14th largest freshwater lake by area in the world. It is comparable in size to Lake Ontario. Ladoga Lacus, a methane lake on Saturn's moon Titan, is named after the lake.

Etymology
In one of Nestor's chronicles from the 12th century a lake called "the Great Nevo" is mentioned, a clear link to the Neva River and possibly further to Finnish nevo 'sea' or neva 'bog, quagmire'. 

Ancient Norse sagas and Hanseatic treaties both mention a city made of lakes named Old Norse Aldeigja or Aldoga. Since the beginning of the 14th century this hydronym was commonly known as Ladoga. According to T. N. Jackson, it can be taken "almost for granted that the name of Ladoga first referred to the river, then the city, and only then the lake". Therefore, he considers the primary hydronym Ladoga to originate in the eponymous inflow to the lower reaches of the Volkhov River whose early Finnic name was Alodejoki (corresponding to modern ) 'river of the lowlands'.

The Old Norse intermediary word between Finnish and Old East Slavic word is fully supported by archeology, since the Scandinavians first appeared in Ladoga in the early 750s, that is, a couple of decades before the Slavs.

Other hypotheses about the origin of the name derive it from  'wave' and  'wavy', or from the Russian dialectal word алодь, meaning 'open lake, extensive water field'. Eugene Helimski by contrast, offers an etymology rooted in German. In his opinion, the primary name of the lake was  'old source', associated to the open sea, in contrast to the name of the Neva River (flowing from Lake Ladoga) which would derive from the German expression for 'the new'. Through the intermediate form *Aldaugja,  came about, referring to the city of Ladoga.

Geography

The lake has an average surface area of 17,891 km2 (excluding the islands), slightly larger than Kuwait. Its north-to-south length is 219 km and its average width is 83 km; the average depth is 51 m, although it reaches a maximum of 230 m in the north-western part. Basin area: 276,000 km2, volume: 837 km3 (earlier estimated as 908 km3). There are around 660 islands, with a total area of about 435 km2. Ladoga is, on average, 5 m above sea level. Most of the islands, including the famous Valaam archipelago, Kilpola and Konevets, are situated in the northwest of the lake.

Separated from the Baltic Sea by the Karelian Isthmus, it drains into the Gulf of Finland via the Neva River.

Lake Ladoga is navigable, being a part of the Volga-Baltic Waterway connecting the Baltic Sea with the Volga River. The Ladoga Canal bypasses the lake in the south, connecting the Neva to the Svir.

The basin of Lake Ladoga includes about 50,000 lakes and 3,500 rivers longer than 10 km. About 85% of the water inflow is due to tributaries, 13% is due to precipitation, and 2% is due to underground waters.

Geological history

Geologically, the Lake Ladoga depression is a graben and syncline structure of Proterozoic age (Precambrian). This "Ladoga–Pasha structure", as it is known, hosts Jotnian sediments. During the Pleistocene glaciations the depression was partially stripped of its sedimentary rock fill by glacial overdeepening. During the Last Glacial Maximum, about 17,000 years BP, the lake served likely as a channel that concentrated ice of the Fennoscandian Ice Sheet into an ice stream that fed glacier lobes further east. 

Deglaciation following the Weichselian glaciation took place in the Lake Ladoga basin between 12,500 and 11,500 radiocarbon years BP. Lake Ladoga was initially part of the Baltic Ice Lake (70–80 m. above present sea level), a historical freshwater stage of Baltic Sea. It is possible, though not certain, that Ladoga was isolated from it during regression of the subsequent Yoldia Sea brackish stage (10,200–9,500 BP). The isolation threshold should be at Heinjoki to the east of Vyborg, where the Baltic Sea and Ladoga were connected by a strait or a river outlet at least until the formation of the River Neva, and possibly even much later, until the 12th century AD or so.

At 9,500 BP, Lake Onega, previously draining into the White Sea, started emptying into Ladoga via the River Svir. Between 9,500 and 9,100 BP, during the transgression of Ancylus Lake, the next freshwater stage of the Baltic, Ladoga certainly became part of it, even if they hadn't been connected immediately before. During the Ancylus Lake subsequent regression, around 8,800 BP Ladoga became isolated.

Ladoga slowly transgressed in its southern part due to uplift of the Baltic Shield in the north. It has been hypothesized, but not proven, that waters of the Litorina Sea, the next brackish-water stage of the Baltic, occasionally invaded Ladoga between 7,000 and 5,000 BP. Around 5,000 BP the waters of the Saimaa Lake penetrated Salpausselkä and formed a new outlet, River Vuoksi, entering Lake Ladoga in the northwestern corner and raising its level by 1–2 m.

The River Neva originated when the Ladoga waters at last broke through the threshold at Porogi into the lower portions of Izhora River, then a tributary of the Gulf of Finland, between 4,000 and 2,000 BP. Dating of some sediments in the northwestern part of Lake Ladoga suggests it happened at 3,100 radiocarbon years BP (3,410–3,250 calendar years BP).

Wildlife
The Ladoga is rich with fish. 48 forms (species and infra specific taxa) of fish have been encountered in the lake, including roach, carp bream, zander, European perch, ruffe, endemic variety of smelt, two varieties of Coregonus albula (vendace), eight varieties of Coregonus lavaretus, a number of other Salmonidae as well as, albeit rarely, endangered Atlantic sturgeon (formerly confused with European sea sturgeon). Commercial fishing was once a major industry but has been hurt by overfishing. After the war, between 1945–1954, the total annual catch increased and reached a maximum of 4,900 tonnes. However, unbalanced fishery led to the drastic decrease of catch in 1955–1963, sometimes to 1,600 tonnes per year. Trawling has been forbidden in Lake Ladoga since 1956 and some other restrictions were imposed. The situation gradually recovered, and in 1971–1990 the catch ranged between 4,900 and 6,900 tonnes per year, about the same level as the total catch in 1938. Fish farms and recreational fishing are developing. 

It has its own endemic ringed seal subspecies known as the Ladoga seal.

Since the beginning of the 1960s Ladoga has become considerably eutrophicated.

Nizhnesvirsky Natural Reserve is situated along the shore of Lake Ladoga immediately to the north of the mouth of the River Svir.

The Ladoga has a population of Arctic char that is genetically close to the chars of Lake Sommen and Lake Vättern in southern Sweden.

History 

In the Middle Ages, the lake formed a vital part of the  trade route from the Varangians to the Eastern Roman Empire, with the Norse emporium at Staraya Ladoga defending the mouth of the Volkhov since the 8th century. In the course of the Swedish–Novgorodian Wars, the area was disputed between the Novgorod Republic and Sweden. In the early 14th century, the fortresses of Korela (Kexholm) and Oreshek (Nöteborg) were established along the banks of the lake.

The ancient Valaam Monastery was founded on the island of Valaam, the largest in Lake Ladoga, abandoned between 1611–1715, restored in the 18th century, and evacuated to Finland during the Winter War in 1940. In 1989 the monastic activities in the Valaam were resumed. Other historic cloisters in the vicinity are the Konevets Monastery, which sits on the Konevets island, and the Alexander-Svirsky Monastery, which preserves samples of medieval Muscovite architecture.

During the Ingrian War, a fraction of the Ladoga coast was occupied by Sweden. In 1617, by the Treaty of Stolbovo, the northern and western coast was ceded by Russia to Sweden. In 1721, after the Great Northern War, it was restitutioned to Russia by the Treaty of Nystad. In the 18th century, the Ladoga Canal was built to bypass the lake which was prone to winds and storms that destroyed hundreds of cargo ships.

Later, from around 1812–1940 the lake was shared between Finland and Russia. According to the conditions of the 1920 Tartu Peace Treaty militarization of the lake was severely restricted. However, both Soviet Russia and Finland had flotillas in Ladoga (see also Finnish Ladoga Naval Detachment). After the Winter War (1939–40) according to the Moscow Peace Treaty, Ladoga, previously shared with Finland, became an internal basin of the Soviet Union.

During World War II not only Finnish and Soviet, but also German and Italian vessels operated there (see also Naval Detachment K and Regia Marina). Under these circumstances, during much of the Siege of Leningrad (1941–44), Lake Ladoga provided the only access to the besieged city as a section of the eastern shore remained in Soviet hands. Supplies were transported into Leningrad with trucks on winter roads over the ice, the "Road of Life", and by boat in the summer. After World War II, Finland lost the Karelia region again to the USSR, and all Finnish citizens were evacuated from the ceded territory. Ladoga became an internal Soviet basin once again. The northern shore, Ladoga Karelia with the town of Sortavala, is now part of the Republic of Karelia. The western shore, Karelian Isthmus, became part of Leningrad Oblast.

Lists

Tributaries
(incomplete list)
 Svir River from Lake Onega (south-east, discharge: 790 m3/s);
 Volkhov River from Lake Ilmen (south, discharge: 580 m3/s);
 Vuoksi River (and Burnaya River) from Lake Saimaa in Finland (west, discharge: 540 m3/s).
 Syas River (south, discharge: 53 m3/s).
 Olonka River from Lake Utozero

Towns upon the lake
 Shlisselburg (at )
 Novaya Ladoga (at )
 Syasstroy (at )
 Pitkyaranta (at )
 Sortavala (at )
 Lakhdenpokhya (at )
 Priozersk (at )

Image gallery

References

External links

 
 Simola, Heikki et al. (eds), Proceeding of The First International Lake Ladoga Symposium. Special issue of Hydrobiologia. Vol. 322, Issues 1–3. / April 1996.
 Ladoga Lake (photos) 
 War on Lake Ladoga, 1941–1944
 Maps

Ladoga
LLadoga
Karelian Isthmus
Ladoga
Mesoproterozoic rifts and grabens
Ladoga